Timmy Allen (born January 9, 2000) is an American college basketball player for the Texas Longhorns of the Big 12 Conference. He previously played for the Utah Utes.

High school career
Allen grew up playing baseball, football and basketball. He played his first two years of varsity basketball for Desert Ridge High School in Mesa, Arizona. As a sophomore, he averaged 21.3 points and 9.4 rebounds per game. For his junior season, Allen transferred to Red Mountain High School in Mesa, because the school was closer to where his mother was receiving cancer treatment. He sat out his first nine games due to Arizona Interscholastic Association transfer rules. As a senior, Allen averaged 29.8 points, 11.3 rebounds and 3.1 assists per game. He played Amateur Athletic Union basketball for the Compton Magic.

Recruiting
Allen was a consensus four-star recruit, with 247Sports considering him the top player from Arizona in the 2018 class. On September 19, 2017, he committed to play college basketball for Utah over offers from Iowa State, Texas Tech, San Diego State and UCLA, among others.

College career
In late January 2019, during his freshman season, Allen registered two double-doubles in a span of six days, leading Utah to wins over Colorado and California. On February 2, he scored a season-high 24 points in an 81–72 loss to Oregon State. As a freshman, Allen averaged 12.2 points, 5.1 rebounds and 2.5 assists per game, earning Pac-12 All-Freshman Team honors. By the time he was a sophomore, he lost 25 lbs (11 kg) and was placed in a leading role, with many key players graduating or transferring. On December 4, 2019, Allen scored a career-high 27 points along with five rebounds and five assists in a 102–95 overtime victory over BYU. On December 18, he scored 25 points to lead Utah to a 69–66 upset win over sixth-ranked Kentucky. Allen averaged 17.3 points, 7.3 rebounds, three assists and 1.2 steals per game as a sophomore and was named to the Second Team All-Pac-12. He was the only Power Five player that season to average at least 17 points, seven rebounds, 2.5 assists and one steal per game. Following the season, he declared for the 2020 NBA draft, before returning to college. As a junior, Allen averaged 17.2 points, 6.4 rebounds and 3.9 assists per game, earning First Team All-Pac-12 honors. 

After a coaching change at Utah, Allen transferred to Texas. He was named to the Second-team All-Big 12 as well as the All-Newcomer Team. Allen averaged 12.1 points, 6.4 rebounds, and 1.2 steals per game. On February 11, 2023, Allen scored his 2,000th point in a win against West Virginia.

Career statistics

College

|-
| style="text-align:left;"| 2018–19
| style="text-align:left;"| Utah
| 29 || 26 || 28.8 || .575 || .571 || .735 || 5.1 || 2.4 || .9 || .2 || 12.2
|-
| style="text-align:left;"| 2019–20
| style="text-align:left;"| Utah
| 31 || 31 || 35.6 || .441 || .211 || .722 || 7.3 || 3.0 || 1.2 || .2 || 17.3
|-
| style="text-align:left;"| 2020–21
| style="text-align:left;"| Utah
| 25 || 25 || 35.1 || .465 || .268 || .769 || 6.4 || 3.9 || 1.3 || .2 || 17.2
|-
| style="text-align:left;"| 2021–22
| style="text-align:left;"| Texas
| 34 || 34 || 29.0 || .493 || .267 || .731 || 6.4 || 2.1 || 1.2 || .4 || 12.1
|-
|- class="sortbottom"
| style="text-align:center;" colspan="2"| Career
| 119 || 116 || 31.9 || .483 || .267 || .738 || 6.3 || 2.8 || 1.2 || .3 || 14.6

Personal life
Allen's mother, Elise, died from breast cancer during his junior season in high school, about seven years after being first diagnosed with the disease. His older brother, Teddy, played college basketball for West Virginia and Nebraska and now competes for the New Mexico State Aggies.

References

External links
Texas Longhorns bio
Utah Utes bio

2000 births
Living people
American men's basketball players
Basketball players from Arizona
Small forwards
Sportspeople from Mesa, Arizona
Texas Longhorns men's basketball players
Utah Utes men's basketball players